Peak Downs Mine is a large open cut coking coal mine in Queensland located 31 km SSE of Moranbah. Peak Downs is one of seven mines in Bowen Basin owned by BHP Mitsubishi Alliance, Australia's largest coal miner and exporter. Production at Peak Downs started in 1972.

The Caval Ridge Coal Mine, which will be located adjacent to Peak Downs, will begin  construction in 2011 and begin exporting by 2014. It is expected to process 2.5 million tons of coal each year from Peak Downs.

The National Pollution Inventory revealed this mine was the biggest generator of airborne pollution in the country for the 2015–16 financial year.

See also

Coal in Australia

References

External links
 University of Queensland: Queensland Places:Peak Downs

Coal mines in Queensland
Mines in Central Queensland
Mines in Queensland
Open-pit mines
Surface mines in Australia